Klaus Quinkert (5 December 1930 – 11 February 2018) was a German football manager.

References

1930 births
2018 deaths
German football managers
KFC Uerdingen 05 managers
Rot-Weiss Essen managers
West German football managers
People from Wesel (district)
Sportspeople from Düsseldorf (region)